"I Don't Wanna Play House" is a song written by Billy Sherrill and Glenn Sutton.  In 1967, the song was Tammy Wynette's first number one country song as a solo artist.  "I Don't Wanna Play House" spent three weeks at the top spot and a total of eighteen weeks on the chart. The recording earned Wynette the 1968 Grammy Award for Best Female Country Vocal Performance.  The song was released in the UK in 1976, which made the Top 40.

Content
In the song, the narrator, a young mother whose husband has left her, overhears her daughter describing to a neighbor boy their broken home, and informing him that she doesn't want to play house  since, after observing her parents' troubles, she knows that it cannot be fun.

Chart performance

Barbara Ray versions 
In 1973, South African singer Barbara Ray recorded a version that was a number-one hit in her home country as well as a top 10 hit in Australia, reaching No. 3 later in the year. Her version was South Africa's highest-selling single of 1973.

Charts

Other versions 
Connie Francis released a cover version of the song in August 1968. It peaked at # 40 on Billboard's Adult Contemporary Charts.
Skeeter Davis covered the song on her 1968 album Why So Lonely?.
Lynn Anderson (then the wife of the song's co-writer, Sutton) covered the song in 1970 on her album Rose Garden.
Loretta Lynn covered the song on her 1968 album, Fist City.
Mona Gustafsson recorded the song on her 2010 album Countrypärlor.

References

1967 singles
Tammy Wynette songs
Connie Francis songs
Number-one singles in South Africa
Songs written by Glenn Sutton
Songs written by Billy Sherrill
Song recordings produced by Billy Sherrill
Epic Records singles
1967 songs